The Chery Tiggo 5 is a compact crossover produced by Chery under the Tiggo product series.

Overview
The Chery Tiggo 5 was launched in November 2013 on the 2013 Guangzhou Auto Show. The Chery Tiggo 5 was later launched in China on November 28, pricing starts around 100,000 yuan to 150,000 yuan. The Tiggo 5 is slightly larger and is positioned above the Chery Tiggo 3 compact crossover.

Gallery

References

External links

Official website

X5
Tiggo 5
Compact sport utility vehicles
Crossover sport utility vehicles
Cars introduced in 2013
Cars of China